Keshan is a county in western Heilongjiang province, China, about  northeast of Qiqihar, which administers it. It is named from a city-shaped extinct volcano, which has a name of Erkeshan in its territory. Post Code: 161610. The seat of Keshan County is located in Keshan Town.

Geography and climate

Keshan has a humid continental climate (Köppen Dwa/Dwb), with long, bitterly cold, but dry winters, and humid, very warm summers. A majority of the annual precipitation falls in July and August alone. With monthly percent possible sunshine ranging from 54% in July to 71% in February, sunshine is abundant and the area receives 2,710 hours of bright sunshine annually.

Administrative divisions
There are seven towns and eight townships in the county: 

Towns:
Keshan, Beixing, Xicheng, Gucheng, Beilian, Xihe, Shuanghe

Townships:
Henan Township,  Hebei Township, Gubei Township, Xilian Township, Fazhan Township, Xijian Township, Xianghua Township, Shuguang Township

References

External links

 
Volcanoes of China
Extinct volcanoes
Districts of Qiqihar
County level divisions of Heilongjiang
Landforms of Heilongjiang